Birdsall is a surname that derives from Birdsall in North Yorkshire, England. It may refer to:
 Ausburn Birdsall (1814–1903), U.S. Representative from New York
 Ben Birdsall (born 1967), English writer and artist
 Benjamin P. Birdsall (1858–1917), American politician 
 Byron Birdsall (1937–2016), American painter
 Dave Birdsall (1838–1896), American baseball player
 Derek Birdsall (born 1934), British graphic designer
 Doris Birdsall (died 2008), British politician
 Doug Birdsall, president of American Bible Society
 Emma Birdsall (born 1992), Australian singer-songwriter
 Horatio L. Birdsall (1833–1891), American soldier
 James Birdsall (1783–1856), U.S. Representative from New York
 Jeanne Birdsall (born 1951) American author of children's literature
 Jesse Birdsall (born 1963), English actor
 John Birdsall (1802–1839), New York and Texas lawyer and politician
 John Birdsall (1840–1891), New York politician
 Mary Birdsall (1828–1894), America journalist and suffragist
 Nancy Birdsall (born 1946), founding president of the Center for Global Development
 Pam Birdsall, Canadian politician
 Paul M. Birdsall (died 1970), American historian and diplomat
 Richard Birdsall (1799–1852), Canadian surveyor
 Samuel Birdsall (1791–1872), U.S. Representative from New York
 Steve Birdsall (born 1944), Australian aviation writer 
 Timothy Birdsall (1936–1963), English cartoonist
 Tracey Birdsall (born 1963), American actress
 William Birdsall (1854–1909), American Quaker educator

Birdsall as a given or middle name may refer to:
 Birdsall Briscoe (1876–1971), American architect
 Birdsall S. Viault (1932–2012), American historian
 Richard Birdsall Rogers (1857–1927), Canadian engineer
 Sarah Birdsall Otis Edey (1872–1940), American suffragist
 Thomas B. Jackson (1797–1881), American politician

See also
Birdsell

References